Jan Kruliš (born October 3, 1969) is a Czech former professional ice hockey defenceman.

Kruliš played in the Czechoslovak First Ice Hockey League and the Czech Extraliga for HC Kladno and HC Sparta Praha. He also played in the Japan Ice Hockey League for Furukawa Ice Hockey Club, the Austrian Hockey League for EHC Linz and the Elite Ice Hockey League for the Nottingham Panthers.

References

External links

1969 births
Living people
EHC Black Wings Linz players
Bracknell Bees players
Czech ice hockey defencemen
LHK Jestřábi Prostějov players
HC Kometa Brno players
Nottingham Panthers players
Rytíři Kladno players
HC Sparta Praha players
Sportspeople from Kladno
HC Tábor players
Újpesti TE (ice hockey) players
Czechoslovak ice hockey defencemen
Czech expatriate ice hockey people
Czech expatriate sportspeople in Japan
Czech expatriate sportspeople in Austria
Czech expatriate sportspeople in England
Czech expatriate sportspeople in Hungary
Expatriate ice hockey players in Japan
Expatriate ice hockey players in Austria
Expatriate ice hockey players in England
Expatriate ice hockey players in Hungary